Seeds of Vengeance is an American film released in 1920. It was directed by Ollie Sellers. It was an adaptation of Margaret Prescott's The Sowing of Alderson Cree. The film starred Bernard Durning. It was a C. R. Macauley Photoplay.

It was a 5-reel film was produced by Select Pictures.

Sada Cowan wrote the scenario.

The film is one of at least three Sellers directed with Durning as an actor.

Cast
Bernard Durning
Pauline Starke as Ellen Dawe
Gloria Hope
Eugenie Besserer
Charles Elder (actor)
Jack Curtis
Evelyn Selbie
George Hernandez
Jack Levering
Burwell Hamrick
George Stone

Reception 
Marion Russell in The Billboard wrote, "Amazingly beautiful photography marks the high lights of this picture, seconded by realistic acting in which character types predominate. Eugenie Besserer gives a stunning performance of a distraught mother. Two charmingly wistful impersonations are contributed by Pauline Starke and Gloria Hope as the youthful heroines. Mr. Macauley is to be congratulated upon a tense, dramatic picture, which grips despite the basic idea is one of hate and vengeance".

The Picturegoer called it "fair entertainment".

References

External links 

 

1920 films
1920 drama films
Films directed by Oliver L. Sellers
American silent films
1920s American films